The large moth family Arctiidae contains the following genera with names beginning from N to Z:

(For names beginning from A to M, see List of arctiid genera: A–M.)

N

O

P

Q
Quadrasura

R

S

T

U

V

W

X

Y
Yelva

Z

References 

 List N
Arctiid